Glenmarie (also known as CGC-Glenmarie for sponsorship reasons) is a light rapid transit (LRT) station in Glenmarie near Kelana Jaya in Subang, Selangor. The station will serve as an interchange with the Shah Alam line which is currently under construction and will be targeted to open in 2024.

It is operated under the Kelana Jaya LRT system network as found in the station signage. Like most other LRT stations operating in Klang Valley, this station is elevated.

Despite sharing the same name, the LRT station will not be an interchange with Glenmarie Komuter station on the Subang Skypark extension of the Terminal Skypark Line, which is located approximately 2.6 km away near Glenmarie Industrial Park. The LRT station is instead located on the Subang Airport Road adjacent to the neighbourhood of SS7, Kelana Jaya. There is a Park-and-Ride facility provided as well.

This station also is near to MBPJ Stadium, that home venue to Petaling Jaya Rangers, that currently competes in the Malaysia third tier football league. There is also a walking distance to Lincoln University College.

From 30 August 2017, Credit Guarantee Corporation (CGC) Malaysia Berhad acquires the naming right of the station, which is located around 100 metres from CGC's headquarters in Kelana Jaya.

Bus services

Feeder buses

Other buses

References

External links 

Glenmarie LRT station

Kelana Jaya Line
Railway stations opened in 2016